You Said It is a musical by Harold Arlen (music) and Jack Yellen (lyrics) that uses a musical book by Yellen and Sid Silvers.The musical opened at the Chanin's 46th Street Theatre in New York City on January 19, 1931 and ran for 192 performances. The production was directed by John Harwood, choreographed by Danny Dare, and used set designs by Donald Oenslager and Dale Stetson. The production notably launched the career of Lyda Roberti.

The cast included comedian Lou Holtz and Good News (musical) lead Mary Lawlor. Like Good News, the story was set at a college.

Songs Included
(All written by Arlen/Yellen, 1931)

Alma Mater
Beatin' The Blues
Bright And Early
Best Part College Days
Harlem's Gone Collgiate
If He Really Loves Me
It's Different With Me
Learn To Croon
Sweet And Hot
They Learn About Women From Me
What Do We Care?
What'd We Come To College For
Where, Oh Where?
While You Are Young
You'll Do
You Said It

References

External links

Broadway musicals
1931 musicals
Musicals by Harold Arlen
Original musicals